Bellini and the Devil is 2008 Brazilian crime film directed by Marcelo Galvão. Based on Tony Bellotto's homonymous novel, it stars Fabio Assunção as Remo Bellini, a São Paulo-based detective who investigates mysterious murders revolving around The Book of the Law. A sequel to Bellini and the Sphinx, it premiered as the opening film of the 1st Los Angeles Brazilian Film Festival, where Assunção won the award of Best Actor.

Cast
Fábio Assunção as Remo Bellini
Rosanne Mulholland as Gala
Nill Marcondes as Zanqueta
Mariana Clara as Rita
Beto Coville as Mariano
Luíza Curvo as Clarice
Caroline Abras as Silvia
Marco Luque as Alex
Christiano Cochrane as Malta
André Bubman as Odilon
Neuza Romano as Odilon's mother
Javer Monteiro as bartender
Malu Bierrenbach as Érica
Marília Gabriela as Letícia
Jatir Eiró as journalist
Deto Montenegro as pauper

Production
In 2002, after the theatrical release of the Roberto Santucci's Bellini and the Sphinx, the production team cogitate to adapt the second book, Bellini e o Demônio. Malu Mader wanted to direct the film but due to other projects, she did not it. Instead, Galvão was actually hired for it; he cited Aleister Crowley as the main influence, as well as the filmmakers David Lynch and David Cronenberg, and quimbanda and black magic as influences for the work. He also wrote the screenplay, but he felt he was betrayed on the film's theatrical version as the producer Theodoro Fontes modified it. Galvão, however, was satisfied to know that the version released on DVD would contain an extra with a director's cut version.

References

External links

2000s crime films
2008 films
Brazilian crime films
Brazilian detective films
Films based on Brazilian novels
Films set in São Paulo
Films shot in São Paulo
2000s Portuguese-language films
Brazilian sequel films